Emil Urumov (Bulgarian: Емил Урумов) (born 20 January 1984), is a Bulgarian footballer who plays as a striker. He developed his career in Botev Plovdiv's youth teams, and played for the club in the A PFG.

Career statistics

References

Bulgarian footballers
1984 births
Living people
Footballers from Plovdiv
Association football forwards
Botev Plovdiv players
FC Spartak Plovdiv players
PFC Rodopa Smolyan players
FC Maritsa Plovdiv players
First Professional Football League (Bulgaria) players
Second Professional Football League (Bulgaria) players